The Woodstock First Nation are a Maliseet First Nation located in the Canadian Province of New Brunswick. They have an Indian reserve: Woodstock 23. It runs The Brothers 18 jointly with other First Nations.

Economy 
Carleton Enterprise, a member of the Canada Business Network, is responsible for economic development.

References

Maliseet
Communities in Carleton County, New Brunswick
Communities in Saint John County, New Brunswick